The Manawahe Fault line is a seismically active area in the Bay of Plenty Region of the central North Island of New Zealand.

Geology
North of Lake Rotoma, volcanic ignimbrite sheets from multiple eruptions of the Ōkataina Caldera extend towards the Whakatane Graben with the volcanic region being separated from the tectonic Whakatane portion of the Taupō Rift by the Manawahe Fault. The fault continues to east and coast in the Matata fault line. The Manawahe Fault consists of a series of closely-spaced, mainly SSE-dipping fault traces, which are parallel to the North Rotoma Fault at the edge of the north eastern edge of the Rotoma Caldera. The traces are presumed to merge within  of the surface. 
The Manawahe Fault ruptured immediately prior to the 5500 years ago Whakatane eruption of the Ōkataina Caldera and also ruptured several times, associated with the Rotoma Caldera eruptive sequence, and immediately after the Mamaku eruption.

Risks
This intra-rift fault has certainly ruptured several times in the last 10,000 years. The last rupture identified was 636 years ago, with recurrence intervals between 1580–2000 years of a fault with one of the highest slip rates so far defined in the Taupō Volcanic Zone. Although potentially ruptures could be up to 7 Mw if the fault ruptured at the same time as the longer Matata fault, only >5.5 Mw can be definitely assigned on displacements characterised to date as there appears to have never been a single full length fault rupture which would result in a 6.3 Mw event.

References

Seismic faults of New Zealand
Taupō Volcanic Zone
Okataina Volcanic Centre
Geography of the Bay of Plenty Region